Mattawamkeag is a census-designated place (CDP) and the primary village in the town of Mattawamkeag, Penobscot County, Maine, United States. It is in the southwest corner of the town, where the Mattawamkeag River joins the Penobscot. The community is bordered to the south by the town of Winn and to the west, across the Penobscot, by the town of Woodville.

U.S. Route 2 passes through Mattawamkeag, leading southwest  to Bangor and northeast  to Houlton. Maine State Route 157 leads northwest from Mattawamkeag  to East Millinocket.

Mattawamkeag was first listed as a CDP prior to the 2020 census.

Demographics

References 

Census-designated places in Penobscot County, Maine
Census-designated places in Maine